Kothapatnam is a small coastal village in Prakasam district of the Indian state of Andhra Pradesh. It is located in Kothapatnam mandal in Ongole revenue division.

Kothapatnam Beach is one amongst the top attractions in Ongole. Located  from the city, the beach is a great source of entertainment for local people and tourists. The clear blue waters of the sea, the long stretches of sand and the gentle breeze mesmerize you. Boating is available here. But for the Karthika Purnima festival, when locals throng in thousands, the beach is less frequented.

Kothapatnam Pin code is 523286 and postal head office is Kothapatnam.

Motumala, Gadepalem, Pathapadu, Alluru, Ethamukkala are the nearby Villages to Kothapatnam. Kothapatnam is surrounded by Ongole Mandal towards west, Tangutur Mandal towards west, Naguluppala Padu Mandal towards North, Singarayakonda Mandal towards South.

Ongole Rail Way Station (near to Ongole), Karavadi Rail Way Station (near to Ongole) are the Rail way stations reachable from near by towns. How ever Guntur Jn Rail Way Station is major railway station  near to Kothapatnam. Road - Ongole are the nearby by towns to Kothapatnam having road connectivity to Kothapatnam. Bus - Ongole APSRTC Bus Station, Ongole Bypass APSRTC Bus Station, Tanguturu APSRTC Bus Station are the nearby by Bus Stations to Kothapatnam. APSRTC runs Number of busses from major cities to here.

Sriram Family Charitable Trust:

Public Toilets - A pay-and-use toilet was constructed resembling a bus at the Kothapatnam bus stand near here attracting the attention of the passengers.  Parthsararaty Sriram, a young boy from the Kothapatnam village migrated to Chennai to eke out his livelihood and made a fortune as businessman there. He floated Sriram charitable trust named after his family to run social service activities in his native village. The trust realized the need for a public toilet near the bus stand at Kothapatnam and got the toilet designed in the shape of a bus. After completing the construction, it handed over the toilet to the panchayat (Village Council) for maintenance. The panchayat is allowing passengers to use the facility after paying nominal charges to maintain the toilet neat and clean.

Public Community Hall - Kothapatnam can now boast of a spacious "kalyanamandapam" (community hall) with all facilities, thanks to Sriram Family Trust, Chennai. The community hall was constructed at a cost of Rs. 16 lakhs and was inaugurated on Wednesday, 12 October 2005. S. Parthsarathy and his brother S. Nandagopal wanted the kalyanamandapam to be available to all castes and communities free of cost for social, cultural and religious purposes. The brothers wanted to perpetuate the memory of their father, Sriram Venkatarangam Chetty who was born in Kothapatnam and migrated to Chennai in 1900 where he engaged himself in business. Although he only brought his family to Kothapatnam for two years during the evacuation period in 1940s, the link between the family and the village is still active through various charitable activities.

Government Neglect:

All plans to develop Kothapatnam beach as a tourist resort have gone awry, thanks to the neglect of the Tourism Department. Though Kothapatnam beach lies just  from here, it could not be developed as a tourist resort for want of minimum facilities. Firstly, Ongole-Kothapatnam road lies in such an awful condition that tourists dread to go there. Once they reach, the tourists suffer for want of shelter, dress rooms, restaurant etc. The Tourism Department drew up a plan some years ago to develop the beach as a resort. On its request, the Roads and Buildings Department constructed guest rooms and a building for fast food centre to meet the bare needs of the tourists. Though the buildings were handed over to the Tourism Department more than a year ago, they have not been put to use till now and are under lock and key. The buildings are facing neglect, as the Tourism Department neither posted a security guard nor took steps for their maintenance. Even as the buildings lie redundant, tourists are forced to rest in their shade. The Roads and Buildings Department also took up road works in two stretches covering a total distance of 6- and they are expected to be completed in the next six months. It plans to take up the road work in the remaining stretches in a phased manner. As the bridge across Buckingham Canal collapsed two years ago, the Roads and Buildings Department proposes to construct a new bridge in its place under the National Cyclone Relief and Mitigation Project. The district tourism officer post has been lying vacant for the last three years. Unless the Tourism Department fills the post immediately, it will be difficult to maintain the existing infrastructure and complete other facilities in coordination with other departments in time to attract tourists.

Geography 

References

External links

Villages in Prakasam district